Lilac Time may refer to:

Lilac Time (operetta) or Das Dreimäderlhaus, a 1922 operetta
Lilac Time (film), a 1928 American silent romantic war film
Lilac Time, a 1917 play by Jane Cowl and Jane Murfin; basis for the film
The Lilac Time, a British alternative rock band
The Lilac Time (album), a 1987 album by the band
The Lilac Time, a 2008 album by Pelle Carlberg

See also
"Jeannine, I Dream of Lilac Time", theme song for the 1928 film
Lilac Time in Lombard, an annual festival in Lombard, Illinois, US